The Florida Panthers are a professional ice hockey team based in Sunrise, Florida, United States. The Panthers are members of the Atlantic Division of the Eastern Conference in the National Hockey League (NHL). The team was founded as an expansion franchise on December 10, 1992. The team has had ten general managers since their inception.

Key

General managers

Notes
 A running total of the number of general managers of the franchise. Thus any general manager who has two or more separate terms as general manager is only counted once.

See also
List of NHL general managers

References

Florida Panthers
General managers
 
Florida Panthers general managers